Clarence Franklin Robison (June 18, 1923 – September 26, 2006) was a track athlete and coach at Brigham Young University (BYU). As a collegiate runner, Robison competed in the 880, one-mile, and two-mile, setting conference records in the latter two events. Robison put his track career on hold to enlist in the U.S. Navy during World War II and served for three years.

Following the war, Robison capped his career by competing as a member of the U.S. Olympic team and U.S. National Track and Field team.

Robison was the head coach at BYU for 40 years. During that time, he guided his teams to 19 WAC championships and a co-national championship. He coached 118 All-Americans and 26 Olympians.

Early life
Robison was born in Fillmore, Utah, on June 18, 1923. His parents were Archie and Charlottie (Lottie) Robison. He had two older siblings, Rolf and Jene. They lived on a 200-acre farm, growing mainly apples, peaches, pears and watermelons.

In his teenage years, Robison worked for the forest service. He spent his summers in the mountains he loved, building fences and maintaining trails. At the end of each day, when the other workers would load into trucks to make the journey back to town, Robison would run home. His natural running abilities soon became apparent to all who knew him.

As a senior at Millard High School, Robison won the 880-yard run at the state track and field championships. He also played on the school's basketball team.

College career 
In 1940, Robison enrolled at BYU in Provo, Utah. He competed on the track and cross-country teams. At 6-foot-4, he towered over most of the runners he competed against. Robison also made the university's basketball team, but following the advice of his coaches, he opted to focus his efforts solely on track.

Over the course of his collegiate career, Robison lost only one race. He competed in the 880, one-mile, and two-mile, setting conference records in the one-mile and two-mile events.

In 1943, with the country embroiled in World War II, Robison enlisted in the U.S. Navy. He attended officers training school in Albuquerque, New Mexico. While taking classes at the University of New Mexico, he played on the school's basketball team.

After returning from the war, Robison resumed his track career. He then moved to Ann Arbor, Michigan, to attend the University of Michigan, where he earned a master's degree in health science.

Professional career 
In 1948, Robison traveled to Chicago, Illinois to compete in the U.S. Olympic Track and Field Trials. He was among the top finishers in the 5,000-meter run, earning a place on the U.S. Olympic team. He traveled with the team to London, where he competed in the Games of the XIV Olympiad. Because of the disruption of World War II, the 1948 Olympics were the first Summer Olympics held since the 1936 Games in Berlin.

The following year, Robison returned to Europe with the U.S. National Track and Field team. Of the 16 races Robison ran in Europe that summer, he won 12 of them.

Coaching career 
Robison returned to BYU in 1949 and was promptly offered a job as head coach of the track and field team. Though only 25 years old at the time, he agreed to discontinue his own professional career in order to help build BYU's track program.

Over the next 40 years, Robison helped BYU track and field rise to prominence on the national scene. His teams won 19 WAC championships and 118 of his athletes were named All-Americans. Additionally, 26 of them would go on to be Olympians.

Robison also strived to establish BYU track and field as a worldwide presence, organizing six trips to Europe for international competition.

In 1970, Robison's team claimed a share of the national title by winning the Track and Field Federation championship in Lexington, Kentucky. This was the first-ever national championship for a BYU athletic program. Robison's teams finished in the top 10 at the NCAA Championships on nine other occasions.

Robison was named Coach of the Year in the Skyline Conference five times and received the Pembroke Award in 1975. He served on the NCAA Rules Committee and later served as president of the U.S. Track Coaches Association.

Robison retired in 1989 at age 65. He left a legacy of progressive coaching and thoughtful mentorship. Many of his athletes viewed him as a father figure and cherished his personalized teaching style. Robison was inducted into the Utah Sports Hall of Fame, the BYU Hall of Fame and the U.S. Track Coaches Hall of Fame. In 2004, BYU paid tribute to “Coach Robbie” by naming the outdoor track and field facility after him.

Personal 
Robison married Monita Turley on March 31, 1950. They had nine children and 41 grandchildren. Robison was a member of the Church of Jesus Christ of Latter-day Saints. He and his wife served in many leadership positions in their church, including assignments that relocated them to England and Turkey.

Several of Robison's children and grandchildren have competed in track at the collegiate level. His son Mark Robison has also been a BYU track coach.

References 

1923 births
2006 deaths
American Latter Day Saints
BYU Cougars men's track and field athletes
BYU Cougars track and field coaches
Olympic track and field athletes of the United States
People from Fillmore, Utah
Athletes (track and field) at the 1948 Summer Olympics
University of Michigan alumni
American male middle-distance runners
American male long-distance runners
American cross country coaches
BYU Cougars men's cross country runners
United States Navy personnel of World War II